Damal, formerly Petereke, is a town in Ardahan Province of Turkey, on the road from Kars to Posof. It is the seat of Damal District. Its population is 2,890 (2021). It consists of 8 quarters, including İnönü.

History
Damal is on a route across the traditional Silk Road, connecting the Caucasus from Europe to Central Asia and has changed hands many times throughout history, between Armenians, Medes, Persians, Ancient Romans, Georgians, Byzantines and finally the Ottoman Turks. The region was briefly controlled by Imperial Russia but later restored to Turkey after World War One.

Geography
This is a rural area in high mountain, a collection of villages rather than a district built around a central town, watered by mountain springs, the district was created in order to bring more public buildings and government jobs and thus stem the drift of people away from the area.  This part of a Turkey has a cold, hard climate, temperatures drop to -38°C(-36.4°F) in winter.

The rag dolls of Damal are renowned and have won prizes in craftwork festivals.

References

Populated places in Ardahan Province
Damal District
Towns in Turkey